is a title given to senior members of Japanese companies and non-profit organizations. A sodanyaku is often a former president or chairman of the organization who has relinquished day-to-day control of the organization but continues to offer advice to its full-time managers. An advisor may be, but is not always, a director of the organization.

References

Japanese business terms

ja:役員 (会社)